The following is an chronological list of people in the Philippines murdered by assassins. This list includes public figures and other prominent individuals who were active in Philippine politics and daily life. Most of these assassinations are attributed to state forces, rebel groups such as the New People's Army or the Abu Sayyaf Group and hitmen working on behalf of local politicians (mostly due to electoral rivalries), businessmen and organized crime figures and groups.

Assassinations before 1940

1940s

1950s

1960s

1970s

1980s

1990s

2000s

2010s

2020s

See also
 List of assassinations in Asia
 List of people who survived assassination attempts
 List of journalists killed in the Philippines
 Political killings in the Philippines (2001–2010)
 List of massacres in the Philippines

References

Asia
Lists of victims of crimes
Murder in Asia
Philippines-related lists
Deaths in the Philippines
Assassinated Filipino people